Mühlenkopfschanze is a ski jumping hill located in Willingen, Germany. The audience capacity is 35,000.

Ski jumping venues in Germany
Sports venues in Hesse
Buildings and structures in Waldeck-Frankenberg